The Sapelo Island National Estuarine Research Reserve is a  coastal plain estuary, located in the U.S. State of Georgia, protected on its seaward side by a Pleistocene barrier island. It was established in 1976.

Sapelo Island is the fourth largest Georgia barrier island and one of the most pristine. The reserve is made up of salt marshes, maritime forests and beach dune areas. Not only is the island rich in natural history, but also in human history dating back 4,000 years.

References
 Sapelo Island National Estuarine Research Reserve

Protected areas of Georgia (U.S. state)
National Estuarine Research Reserves of the United States
Protected areas of McIntosh County, Georgia
Estuaries of the United States
Bodies of water of Georgia (U.S. state)
Landforms of McIntosh County, Georgia